Pantolestidae is an extinct family of semi-aquatic, non-placental eutherian mammals. Forming the core of the equally extinct suborder Pantolesta, the pantolestids evolved as a series of increasingly otter-like forms, ranging from the Middle Paleocene (60 mya) Bessoecetor to the Late Eocene (Ergilian) (50-33 mya) Gobiopithecus and Kiinkerishella.  They first appear in North America, whence they spread to Europe.

Description 

They had moderately strong canines and multi-cusped cutting teeth supported by the strong jaw muscles to which cranial cavities were adapted.  This combination of dentition and muscles has been interpreted as an early adaptation to a hard diet such as clams and snails.

Freely articulated forearm bones (radius and ulna) permitted their powerful forelimbs wide rotational movements, while their digits had large bony claws indicating they could dig and build underground dens.  Their powerful hind limbs could not be rotated in the same way, but the prominent transverse processes of the first tail vertebra suggest that they used their powerful tails to propel through the water like modern otters. In later pantolestids there is a prominent cranial crest combined with strong spinal processes, indicating the presence of strong neck muscles needed by swimmers that constantly hold their heads above the water surface.

The youngest pantolestids known are Gobiopithecus khan and Kiinkerishella zaisanica from the Ergilian deposits of Khoer Dzan, Mongolia. These late Asian forms are thought to be one of the few examples of European mammals dispersing into Asia during the Grande Coupure.

Classification 
 Family: †Pantolestidae (Cope, 1884)
 Subfamilies
 †Pentacodontinae (Simpson, 1937)
 Amaramnis
 Aphronorus
 Bisonalveus
 Coriphagus
 Pentacodon
 †Pantolestinae (Cope, 1884)
 Bessoecetor
 Bogbia
 Bouffinomus
 Buxolestes
 Chadronia
 Galethylax
 Oboia
 Palaeosinopa
 Pagonomus
 Pantolestes
 Thelysia
 Todralestes
 †Dyspterninae (Kretzoi, 1943)
 Cryptopithecus
 Dyspterna
 Gobipithecus
 Kochictis

Notes

References

External links 
 

Cimolestans
Paleocene mammals
Eocene mammals
Late Cretaceous first appearances
Oligocene extinctions
Prehistoric mammal families